José Balbino da Silva (born 23 March 1896 - deceased) was a Portuguese footballer who played as a forward.

External links 
 
 

1896 births
Portuguese footballers
Association football forwards
FC Porto players
Portugal international footballers
Year of death missing
Place of birth missing